Luonan Subdistrict is a subdistrict in Hongshan District, Wuhan, Hubei, China. It includes Central China Normal University and part of Wuhan University of Technology. The area was part of Luojiashan Subdistrict until 1986. The name of the subdistrict means "south of Luo", referring to its position south of Luojiashan Subdistrict & Mt. Luojia.

History

Luonan Subdistrict comprised the southern portion of Luojiashan Subdistrict and its predecessors from 1950 to 1986. Luojiashan Subdistrict shifted between Wuchang District and Hongshan District numerous times during this period.

On July 28, 1986, the 27 communities of Wuchang District's Luojiashan Subdistrict to the south of Bayi Road were transferred to Hongshan District. Luonan Subdistrict was created on September 1 with its headquarters in Wuluocun.

In December 2009, Fengguang Community and part of Shipailing Community were transferred from Wuchang to Luonan Subdistrict.

In November 2010, it was decided that nine Communities of Luonan Subdistrict (Wuhuan, Fushushan, Tiyuan, Shangwen, Zhuodaoquan, Huquan, Mazhuangyuan, Jinchang and Gaochuang) would form part of the new Zhuodaoquan Subdistrict, which was officially implemented in May 2011, after the 2010 Census.

Geography

There are two stations of Line 2, Wuhan Metro in Luonan Subdistrict: Jiedaokou Station and Guangbutun Station. There are also two  stations of the Line 8, Wuhan Metro in Luonan Subdistrict: Jiedaokou Station and Mafangshan Station.

Administrative Divisions
Luonan Subdistrict is made up of 26 communities.

References

Geography of Wuhan
Township-level divisions of Hubei
Subdistricts of the People's Republic of China